Eoophyla palleuca is a moth in the family Crambidae. It was described by George Hampson in 1906. It is found in Borneo.

References

Eoophyla
Moths described in 1906